Madhabdi is a pourashava (municipal corporation) in Narsingdi District, Dhaka division, Bangladesh. It's an A grade municipality and also Madhabdi has declared as a thana on 29 February 2016.  Madhabdi is a densely textile commercial and industrial area, where a number of automatic and hand-made loom weaving and manufacturing mills (about 3000/4500) are situated. There are about 45,000 people employed directly and indirectly in these mills. It's also one of the richest area in Narsingdi District.

History
In 1971 a column of Pakistan army with two trucks were ambushed here by Mukti Bahini.

References

External links

Populated places in Narsingdi District